Fan Death Records is an independent record label based in Baltimore, Maryland, and Montreal, Quebec. The label is operated by Sean Gray, Chris Berry, and Tracy Soo-Ming.

Fan Death is affiliated with DNA Test Fest, a noise rock and experimental music festival held in Baltimore every year. The label began in 2007 in with Gray's radio show DNA in the DNA on WMUC-FM in College Park, Maryland.

Discography
 FDR-001 - Clockcleaner - Ready To Fight 12" 
 FDR-002 - Drunkdriver - Knife Day 7"
 FDR-003 - Ringo Deathstarr - Ringo Deathstarr 12"
 FDR-004 - Taco Leg - Freemason's Hall 7"
 FDR-005 - Lamps - The Role Of The Dogcatcher In African-American Urban Folklore 7"
 FDR-006 - Pygmy Shrews - Lord Got Busted 7"
 FDR-007 - The New Flesh - Demo CS (reissue)
 FDR-008 - Locrian - Rain of Ashes CS
 FDR-009 - FNU Ronnies - Golem Smoke CS (US issue)
 FDR-010 - Pfisters – Narcicity LP
 FDR-011 - Broken Neck - Fights Over Nothing CS
 FDR-012 - The Chickens - s/t CS
 FDR-013 - Puerto Rico Flowers - 4 12"
 FDR-014 - Jason Urick – This Is Critical 7″
 FDR-015 - Twin Stumps – Live at Shea Stadium CS (benefit for Mike Yaniro)
 FDR-016 - Neon Blud – Whipps 7″
 FDR-017 - Psychedelic Horseshit – Acid Tape CS
 FDR-018 - Screen Vinyl Image - Ice Station CS
 FDR-018EP - Screen Vinyl Image – Siberian Eclipse 7″
 FDR-019 - Broken Water – Normal Never Happened 7″
 FDR-020 - Twin Stumps - Seedbed LP/CD
 FDR-021 - Puerto Rico Flowers - 2 7"
 FDR-022 - Bodycop - s/t CS
 FDR-023 - Pleasure Leftists - Together Apart 12"
 FDR-024 - Homostupids - Great Music Collection CS
 FDR-025 - Puerto Rico Flowers - 7 12"
 FDR-026 - To Live and Shave in L.A. - The Cortège 12"
 FDR-027 - Leather - Wretch 7"
 FDR-028 - Locrian - The Clearing LP
 FDR-029 - Ed Schrader's Music Beat - Welcome to the Roman Empire CS
 FDR-030 - Roomrunner CS
 FDR-031 - Überchriist - s/t CS
 FDR-032 - Woollen Kits CS
 FDR-033 - Roomrunner - Super Vague + Live @ WFMU CS
 FDR-034 - Taco Leg - s/t LP
 FDR-035 - Purling Hiss - A Little Off-Center (Live at WFMU) CS
 FDR-036 - Roomrunner - Ideal Cities CD/LP
 FDR-095 - Clockcleaner - Nevermind 12"

See also
 List of record labels

References

External links
Official website

American independent record labels
Record labels established in 2008
Punk record labels
Noise music record labels
Experimental music record labels
Record labels based in Maryland